Sineus and Truvor were the brothers of Rurik, a chieftain of the Varangian  Rus' considered to be the founder of the Rurik dynasty, which later ruled the state of Kievan Rus' in Eastern Europe.

Description

Rurik, the oldest of the brothers, established himself in Novgorod, while Sineus established himself at Beloozero, on the shores of Lake Beloye, and Truvor at Izborsk, although archaeological findings have also suggested that his residence was in Pskov. Truvor and Sineus died shortly after the establishment of their territories, and Rurik consolidated these lands into his own territory, thus laying the foundations for the state of Kievan Rus'.

According to popular 20th-century scholarly interpretation (summarized in the textbook by Katsva and Yurganov), the phrase "Rurik, Sineus, en Truvor" should be read "Rurik, sine hus, en tro(gna) vär(ingar)" (Rurik, his house/relatives, and true companions). However modern linguistical expertise shows that "sine hus" and "thru varing" contradict basic morphology and syntax of known old Scandinavian dialects, and could never be translated as "our faithful" and "his households". On the other hand, historians of the 19th century (A. Kunik, N. Belyaev, et al.) had already found common old Scandinavian names such as Signjótr (also Sveinn?) and Þórvar[ð]r, which could fit well with "Sineus" and "Truvor" by Nestor's transcription.

See also
 Rurikid dynasty
 Rorik of Dorestad

References

External links
 

Varangians
9th-century Vikings